Avtozavodsky City District is the name of several city divisions in Russia. The name literally means "pertaining to an automotive plant".
 Avtozavodsky City District, Nizhny Novgorod, a city district of Nizhny Novgorod, the administrative center of Nizhny Novgorod Oblast
 Avtozavodsky City District, Tolyatti, a city district of Tolyatti, a city in Samara Oblast

See also 
 Avtozavodsky (disambiguation)

References